The Pennsylvania Packet and the General Advertiser was an American newspaper founded in 1771 that, in 1784, became the first successful daily newspaper published in the United States.

The paper was founded by John Dunlap as a weekly paper in late 1771. It was based in Philadelphia except during the British occupation of the city in 1777–1778, when Dunlap published the paper at Lancaster. David C. Claypoole eventually became a partner with Dunlap.  As of September 21, 1784, the paper was issued as the Pennsylvania Packet, and Daily Advertiser, reflecting the paper's move to daily publication.

The paper subsequently underwent additional name changes, dropping the Pennsylvania Packet prefix in 1791, and becoming  Dunlap's American Daily Advertiser (1791–1793), Dunlap and Claypoole's American Daily Advertiser (1793–1795), and Claypoole's American Daily Advertiser (1796-1800).

On September 21, 1796, it was the first to publish George Washington's Farewell Address.

In 1800, Zachariah Poulson purchased the paper and renamed it Poulson's American Daily Advertiser.

In 1825, the Marquis De Lafayette granted an interview to "Poulson's Advertiser" during his famous visit to the United States.

Poulson ran the paper for almost 40 years, and at end of 1839 sold out to the owners of the recently founded North American.   The North American featured the 1771 founding of the Packet as its heritage.   To the extent it can honestly be traced past this point, the final successor of the Packet can be said to be The Philadelphia Inquirer.

See also
 Early American publishers and printers
 Newspapers of colonial America

References

Newspapers established in 1771
Defunct newspapers published in Pennsylvania
Defunct newspapers of Philadelphia
1771 establishments in Pennsylvania
Publications disestablished in 1840
1840 disestablishments in the United States
Newspapers of colonial America